Klao (also Klaoh), or Kru, is a Kru language of the Niger–Congo language family, spoken primarily in Liberia, with some speakers also in Sierra Leone, Ghana and Guinea. It uses SVO word order for main clauses and SOV for embedded clauses. A Klao translation of the Bible by missionary Nancy Lightfoot was released in 2000. The language has Western, West Central, Central, and Eastern dialects.

References

Kru languages
Languages of Liberia
Languages of Sierra Leone